is a Japanese manga series by Itaru Bonnoki. It has been serialized in Akita Shoten's shōnen manga magazine Weekly Shōnen Champion since June 2015 and has been collected in twenty-four tankōbon volumes. An anime television series adaptation by Madhouse aired from October to December 2021. A second season premiered in January 2023.

Story

Setting
The series takes place in a world where vampires are very real. There are inferior vampires, which are basically animals, and vampire lords, who have human-like physiques and intelligence. All vampire lords have basic vampire abilities and weaknesses, but some of them have special abilities that set them apart from the rest of their kind. They can also find regular animals to make into their immortal familiars.

Some vampires choose to live in peace with humans while others choose to be menaces instead. Thus, some humans take up the role as vampire hunters to keep the hostile vampires in check.

Plot
The story follows the famed vampire hunter, Ronaldo, who receives a job to destroy the supposedly invincible vampire lord Draluc and rescue a human boy he allegedly kidnapped. Upon meeting him in his mansion, however, he quickly realizes that he is only called "invincible" because of his unique ability to revive almost instantly after being reduced to ashes, which is convenient since almost anything can kill him due to him being incredibly weak. The boy who was believed to be a hostage just sneaks into the castle regularly to play Draluc's huge collection of video games. Chaos ensues and Draluc's castle ends up completely destroyed as a result.

Homeless, Draluc then moves into Ronaldo's apartment for the time being, much to Ronaldo's chagrin. He also brings along his familiar, a cute armadillo named John, who Ronaldo becomes fond of. After helping Ronaldo in a case, the two become unofficial partners, often clashing with other vampires and hunters alike.

Characters

The Ronaldo Vampire Hunter Agency

A vampire hunter in his 20s with a base of operations in Shin-Yokohama. Originally not thrilled to have Draluc as a roommate, the success of the partnership in his novel series, The Ronaldo Chronicles, leads him to reluctantly put up with the vampire. He frequently kills Draluc when annoyed. He also has an extreme phobia of celery. In a character interview, he mentions 'Ronaldo' is a nickname he gained in high school. Due to the reading of his name in Japanese, he is sometimes referred to as "Ronald.'

A 208 year old Romanian-Japanese vampire from Transylvania. He enjoys video games and teasing Ronaldo, he has common sense in most situations, and gentlemanly towards women. As Ronaldo's roommate, he takes responsibility for cleaning and cooking, the latter being one of his talents (much to Ronaldo's chagrin). He frequently dies and turns to sand, but being an immortal, he can reconstitute himself quickly - provided his remains aren't interfered with.

A three-banded armadillo from South America and Draluc's familiar. He is loved and adored by all. He is known to say "nu."

Vampire Control Division

An officer from the Vampire Control Division. At 19 years old, she's the youngest Vice Captain in the Division's history. She wields dual blades while on duty. While she presents as firm and strict, she's easily flustered. She loves Draluc's cooking, especially his cookies.

Hinaichi's subordinate. A dhampir and former high school classmate of Ronaldo's. As a mama's boy, he hates that his vampire mother is a fan of Ronaldo's books and seeks to show her a less desirable side of the hunter. His hatred borders on obsession, his room decorated with Ronaldo posters and merchandise.

The captain of the Vampire Control Division and Ronaldo's older brother. He used to be a hunter.

One of the newer Vamp Control officers. He takes his job rather seriously.

A member of Vamp Control, not debuted fully until later in the series.

Vampire Hunters' Guild

A vampire hunter from Ronaldo's guild with metal armor on his left arm. A reformed delinquent, he keeps his composure under most situations but his past will surface if he's angered.

Another hunter from Ronaldo's guild. He has a fetish for girls with body hair. He wears a vaguely American Southwestern style outfit.

A busty hunter dressed as a nun from Ronaldo's guild whose main job is being a Matagi, hunting bears.

A petite girl who works as hunter from Ronaldo's guild, wearing an outfit resembling a cheongsam. She's blunt and straightforward, known for her specific and personal insults.

A Vampire Trainer who uses bondage to train and control inferior vampires.

A former vampire hunter who now serves as the guild's bartender. He receives and assigns jobs given to the guild.

Gosetsu's daughter. She works as a barmaid.

A duck-themed vampire hunter. He's very popular.

A baseball-themed vampire hunter.
 

Two other hunters from the guild.

A dhampir who seeks to exterminate vampires.

Vampires

A mostly nude vampire whose groin is censored by a cluster of geraniums. He has control over plants and anyone he feeds a seed to.

A former serial killer vampire who since entering Shin-Yokohama is a pathetic shell of his former self. He hardens his blood into blades, usually produced from the palm of his hands.

Real name: Odd Von Creature (フォン・ナ・ドゥーブツ Fon na doubutsu). A perverted vampire with little control over his transformation power due to constantly thinking lewd thoughts. His true form is a handsome blond vampire which he can only achieve once he's satisfied or seriously turned off.

A vampire cat now under the ownership of Fukuma.

A handsome vampire who while attempting to flirt with another girl, caught the attention of Maremi instead. Not wanting her advances, he kept trying to run away from her to no avail until she saved his life, after which he turned her out of gratitude.

Formerly a human, now a vampire known as the Empress. She mistook Adam's flirting with her friend to be for her and began stalking him, happy to let him bite her. After awakening as a vampire she became extremely powerful, suggesting she was always meant to be a vampire. Adam bit her after she pushed him out of traffic in order to save his life.

A middle-aged looking vampire who uses his hypnosis power to make people speak their secret fetishes. An old acquaintance of Draus.

A vampire who loves yakyūken that will sequester his opponent in an impenetrable barrier to play. The loser loses their clothes.

A vampire who draws his power from the micro bikini he wears. Anyone he bites dons a micro bikini and is under his control. He is the younger brother of Yakyūken Lover.

A ghostly vampire with the ability to make his lower body transparent. He is the youngest brother of Yakyūken Lover and Micro Bikini.

A vampire who controls ghouls to breach social etiquette and acts as a public nuisance. His real name is Manabu.

An bizarrely shaped vampire with three sets of lips who targets young, handsome men and sucks blood through kisses.

A spider-themed vampire.

Draluc's father. A Romanian native vampire. He worries often for his weak son, but is glad he's doing well in Shin-Yokohama. His Father, the Progenitor (御真祖様), is the head of the Dragon Clan and implied to be Dracula himself.

Draluc's aunt and Draus' sister-in-law. She's quite interested in Ronaldo's pole dancing.
Ura Shin Yokohama

Anti-Aging

Autumn Books

Ronaldo's editor from Autumn Books. A terrifyingly calm man who wields a battleaxe, as all employees of Autumn Books do. He loves cats more than meeting deadlines.

An energetic girl who joined Autumn Books hoping to replace Fukuma as Ronaldo's editor. She has a habit of accidentally using dirty double entendres when talking to Ronaldo.

Others

The director of the Vampire Research Center. He studies vampires for his own reasons, but is often careless and lets his experiments escape. A fox-like mask obscures the top half of his face.

A photographer and reporter for Vampire Hunter Weekly. Being a former high school classmate of Ronaldo's, he follows the hunter's career closely.

The kid from Draluc's castle. He also recently moved to Shin-Yokohama.

The manager of the convenience store, Vamima, which is near the Ronaldo Agency. He frequently requests help for his son, Bubuo.

Boboo's rebellious son who often gets bitten by inferior vampires.

The self-proclaimed Shin-Yokohama Boy Hunters. Three elementary aged boys who go hunting for vampires.

Media

Manga
The Vampire Dies in No Time is written and illustrated by Itaru Bonnoki. The manga began its serialization in Akita Shoten's Weekly Shōnen Champion magazine on June 25, 2015. As of February 2023, twenty-four tankōbon volumes have been released.

Anime
An anime adaptation was announced in the 23rd issue of Weekly Shōnen Champion on May 7, 2020. The adaptation, revealed to be a television series, is animated by Madhouse and directed by Hiroshi Kōjina, with Yukie Sugawara overseeing the series' scripts, Mayuko Nakano designing the characters, and Ryō Takahashi composing the music. The series aired from October 4 to December 20, 2021, on Tokyo MX, BS11, tvk, KBS Kyoto, and SUN. Jun Fukuyama performed the series' opening theme song "Dies in No Time", while Daisuke Ono and Takayuki Kondō, performing as TRD, performed the series' ending theme song "Strangers". Funimation licensed the series outside of Asia. One year later, Netflix later licensing anime adaptation in Asia in August 31.

After the airing of the series' final episode, a second season was announced. The staff members of the first season reprised their roles. The second season premiered on January 9, 2023. Jun Fukuyama and TRD returned to perform the opening and ending theme songs, respectively titled "New Drama Paradise" and "Cozy Crazy Party!".

Episode list

Season 1

Season 2

Notes

References

External links
  
 

2021 anime television series debuts
Akita Shoten manga
Anime series based on manga
Comedy anime and manga
Crunchyroll anime
Funimation
Madhouse (company)
Shōnen manga
Tokyo MX original programming
Vampires in anime and manga